Philipp Mickel Klewin (born 30 September 1993) is a German professional footballer who plays for  club Erzgebirge Aue as a goalkeeper. He made his debut for FC Rot-Weiß Erfurt in April 2013, in a 1–0 defeat against VfB Stuttgart II.

References

External links

1993 births
Living people
German footballers
Association football goalkeepers
2. Bundesliga players
3. Liga players
FC Rot-Weiß Erfurt players
Arminia Bielefeld players
FC Erzgebirge Aue players